South End is a neighborhood in Charlotte, North Carolina, known for its vibrant mix of residential, commercial, and industrial development. The neighborhood is located just south of Uptown Charlotte, the city's central business district, and is bounded by the major thoroughfares of South Boulevard, East/West Boulevard, and Interstate 277.  It is also one of five Municipal Service Districts in Charlotte.

History

Beginnings
South End has its beginning in the 1850s with Charlotte's first railroad line, connecting the Queen City to Columbia and Charleston, SC. As time passed, a thriving manufacturing community sprang up along the tracks, centered on the booming textile industry. The industrial area declined during the 1970s and 1980s, and the area was notorious for abandoned buildings.

Revitalization
Upon the opening of the Lynx Blue Line in 2007, the area has undergone a $2.2 billion transition from abandoned factories to an eclectic mix of office, retail, commercial and high end residential construction, with an additional $1 billion underway. Notable developments include the Design District and Atherton Mill. 

In 2018, South End was named the fastest-growing submarket in the United States for apartment growth.

Charlotte Trolley

The Historic Charlotte Trolley Museum is located in the neighborhood and is run by Charlotte Trolley, Inc., a non-profit organization. Originally, Charlotte offered electric streetcar service from May 20, 1891 to March 14, 1938. Later in the century, Charlotte Trolley, Inc. began buying up the old trolley cars which had come to a state of disrepair.

Charlotte Trolley, Inc. began partnering with the Charlotte Area Transit System (CATS) to integrate the vintage trolley service with the rest of Charlotte-Mecklenburg's extensive transit network. Light rail tracks were constructed in 2003 that ran from Atherton Mill in South End to 9th Street uptown. Service was halted in the early 2005 when a new track system began construction for the Charlotte LYNX light rail system. Service resumed on April 20, 2008 but has since been discontinued.

References

External links 
 
 
 South End Charlotte

Neighborhoods in Charlotte, North Carolina
Populated places established in the 1850s